Marie K. Formad (1860 – February 21, 1944) was a Russian Empire-born American physician based in Philadelphia.

Early life 
Formad was born in Russia. She moved to the United States in 1883. Her older brother (sometimes mistakenly referred to as her father) Henry F. Formad was a pathology professor on the faculty at the University of Pennsylvania, and served as Coroner's Physician in Philadelphia. Another brother, Robert Julius Formad, was also a pathologist, an expert on veterinary oncology.

Marie Formad graduated from the Woman's Medical College of Pennsylvania in 1886, with a thesis titled "Some Notes on Criminal Abortion".

Career 
Formad was elected to the post of vaccine physician for Philadelphia's Eleventh District in 1887. She worked for 52 years at Woman's Hospital of Philadelphia, as a teaching surgeon, gynecologist, and pathologist. She was the first woman member of the Obstetrical Society of Philadelphia. With Calista V. Luther and two other women doctors, she ran an evening dispensary, the Medical Aid Society for Self-Supporting Women, to treat working women at a more convenient time than other clinics. She retired in 1938.

During World War I, Formad accepted a commission as a surgeon in the French army in 1917. She served fourteen months, from January 1918 to March 1919, in a Women's Overseas Hospital (WOH) unit in France. She directed and performed surgery a 125-bed refugee hospital at Labouheyre, supported by the National Woman Suffrage Association, working alongside doctors Laura E. Hunt and Mabel Seagrave. The hospital grew under Formad's direction, and served about 10,000 refugees during its existence; two of the American nurses at Labouheyre, Winifred Warder and Eva Emmons, died from influenza there. After the armistice, Formad went to Nancy to work as a surgeon caring for repatriating French civilians. She received the Medaille d'honneur from the French government for her wartime service.

Personal life 
Marie Formad cared for her older brother Henry in his last months; he died in 1892. She died in 1944, aged 83 years, in Philadelphia. She left her estate mainly to her two nieces, Marie and Charlotte.

References

External links 

 An undated portrait of Marie Formad, in the collection of the Drexel University College of Medicine Archives and Special Collections.

1860 births
1944 deaths
American women physicians
American women in World War I
Emigrants from the Russian Empire to the United States